Weston-in-Gordano SSSI is a 12.55 hectare geological Site of Special Scientific Interest near the village of Weston in Gordano, North Somerset, notified in 1993.

Note that there is also a separate biological and geological SSSI covering the Gordano Valley.

This is a Geological Conservation Review site because temporary exposures here have shown Pleistocene sediments, including interglacial fluvial sands and marine gravels and cold-stage fluvial gravels. Rich molluscan faunas have been reported from the section. The presence of freshwater and marine interglacial deposits gives it great potential importance for the understanding of the Quaternary sequence of the Vale of Gordano and Avonmouth lowlands.

References

Sites of Special Scientific Interest in Avon
Sites of Special Scientific Interest notified in 1993